Aukštupėnai mound or Kupiškis mound is a hill fort in Kupiškis, Lithuania.

See also
List of hillforts in Lithuania

References

Hill forts in Lithuania
Kupiškis